Marriage in the Eastern Orthodox Church is a holy mystery (sacrament) in the Eastern Orthodox Church in which a priest marries a man and a woman. The typical Byzantine Rite liturgy for marriage is called the Mystery of Crowning, where the couple is crowned.

Liturgy

The liturgy of the Mystery of Crowning involves the placement of crowns on both heads of the couple in a lengthy ceremony, which is preceded by a betrothal ceremony.

Divorce
Divorce is permitted in the Orthodox Church for various reasons.  The more usual divorce occurs under the pastoral guidance of the spiritual director of the spouses when all attempts at salvaging a marriage have been exhausted. In such cases, remarriage may be possible but there is a special rite for a second marriage which contains a penitential element for the dissolution of the first, i.e. some of the more joyful aspects are removed. Marriage is permitted up to three times in Orthodoxy but each divorce necessitates a short period of excommunication.

Another type of divorce is what is known as a "hieratic divorce", which does not signify the breakdown of the relationship but is a step taken for the sake of the theosis of the spouses and with the full support and blessing of the Church.  This type of divorce may only take place where there is mutual agreement between the two spouses, and is usually carried out in cases where one or both spouses wish to enter into monasticism.

See also

Russian wedding traditions

References

External links
 Weddings, Archdiocese of Thyateira and Great Britain.
 Greek Stefana  Stefana | Greek Wedding Crown History
 Greek Orthodox Wedding  Overview Of A Greek Orthodox Wedding

Marriage in Christianity
Eastern Orthodox liturgy